Silvia Collas (née Aleksieva; born 4 May 1974) is a Bulgarian-French chess player who holds the titles of International Master (IM) and Woman Grandmaster (WGM).

She won the European Girls U20 Championship in 1994. Collas played for Bulgaria in the Women's Chess Olympiads of 1994, 1996, 1998, 2000 and 2002. In December 2002, she transferred to the French Chess Federation and since then represents France. In 2003, she won the Mediterranean women's championship in Beirut. In 2007 Collas became the French women's champion after winning a rapidplay playoff with Sophie Milliet. She has played for the French team at the Women's Chess Olympiad since 2004. In the 2012 event Collas won an individual silver medal thanks to her rating performance of 2469 on board 4.

References

External links
 
 
 
 

1974 births
Living people
Chess International Masters
Chess woman grandmasters
Chess Olympiad competitors
French female chess players
Bulgarian female chess players
Bulgarian emigrants to France
Place of birth missing (living people)